Cowboy in Africa is an ABC television series produced in 1967–1968 by Ivan Tors and starring Chuck Connors. A 1966 television pilot turned into a movie and released to cinemas starring Hugh O'Brian as Jim Sinclair was called Africa Texas Style.

Plot
Jim Sinclair (Chuck Connors) is hired by Commander Hayes (British actor Ronald Howard) to introduce modern methods to his game ranch in Kenya.  He brings his helper and best friend, a Navajo Indian named John Henry.  Together, they work at roping wildlife and building herds on the ranch.  During the first episode, a ten-year-old African boy named Samson (played by Gerald Edwards) watches from afar and decides Jim would make a perfect father.  Samson runs for a day and a half to the Hayes/Sinclair ranch and declares to Jim, the world's champion cowboy, that Jim would be his father.  By the end of the first episode the boy and cowboy have adopted each other.  Samson, John Henry, and Jim Sinclair become a family.

The series competed during its single season for the same time period as the programs Gunsmoke and The Monkees.

Cast
Chuck Connors as Jim Sinclair
Ronald Howard as Commander Hayes
Tom Nardini as John Henry
Gerald Edwards as Samson

Episodes

References

External links

1967 American television series debuts
1968 American television series endings
American Broadcasting Company original programming
Television series by CBS Studios
Television shows set in Kenya